Peter Daniel Young is an American animal rights activist. He was indicted by a federal grand jury in 1998 on charges related to fur farm raids in Iowa, South Dakota, and Wisconsin in 1997. He was in hiding for seven years, before being arrested in San Jose and sentenced to two years' imprisonment in 2005. Young was released in February 2007.

Early life
Young grew up in Los Gatos, California. At the age of nine, he moved to Mercer Island, Washington, near Seattle, where he graduated from Mercer Island High School in 1995. He became vegan in 1994. Young describes himself as becoming more active after being shocked by his visit to a chicken slaughterhouse in the Seattle Chinatown-International District. He participated in a campus animal rights group at the University of Washington, but was not a student there. Young describes himself as being strongly influenced by mid-1990s vegan straight edge bands like Vegan Reich, Earth Crisis, and Raid: "The vegan straightedge scene is directly responsible for the course my life has taken."

Fur farm raids
In the fall of 1997, Young and a friend, Justin Samuel, set off from Washington with the plan to release animals from fur farms in the Midwest on their way to Florida. A two-week period in October saw the release of at least 8,000 mink and fox from six fur farms in Iowa, South Dakota, and Wisconsin, along with the destruction of the breeding records at each farm. On October 28, police officers pulled over Young and Samuel in Sheboygan County, Wisconsin, after officers received a call from fur farmers who suspected that the two were surveying farms. Their vehicle was impounded, and a search warrant application was granted the following day. The search of their vehicle yielded animal rights literature, fur farm addresses, and other suspicious items.

Arrest and imprisonment
In September 1998, a federal grand jury indicted Young and Samuel each on four charges of "Extortion by Interfering with Interstate Commerce", and two charges of "Animal Enterprise Terrorism". Young remained wanted by the FBI for over 7 years.

Samuel was arrested on September 4, 1999, in Belgium and was extradited to the United States to face trial. He agreed to cooperate with the government in exchange for a reduced sentence of two years. Young was arrested in San Jose, California on March 21, 2005, on charges of shoplifting CDs from a local Starbucks and was extradited to Wisconsin to face trial for the fur farm raids.

In August 2005, prosecutors were forced to drop the extortion charges against Young because a Supreme Court ruling had changed the definition of "extortion." In September 2005, Young pleaded guilty to conspiracy to release mink from six fur farms in South Dakota, Wisconsin, and Iowa; and the actual release of 2400 mink from a farm in Medford, Wisconsin. Prosecutors argued that Young had acted on behalf of the Animal Liberation Front, but Young's attorney denied this.

Young was sentenced to two years in federal prison; 360 hours of community service at a charity "to benefit humans and no other species"; $254,000 restitution; and one year probation. He was released from Victorville, California's federal prison on February 1, 2007. Before being sentenced, he told the court, addressing fur farmers, that he would "forever mark those nights on your property as the most rewarding experience of my life."

Since release from prison

Since his release, Young has been giving speeches, selling merchandise on Earth Crisis's reunion tour, and helping to release a vegan straight edge hip hop compilation.

Young has also done numerous speaking engagements and continues to be involved in the animal rights movement. He has been a featured speaker at animal rights conferences held in the United States and has spoken at animal rights conferences in Europe. Young serves as an advisor for the North American Animal Liberation Press Office.

Animal Liberation Front-line

Young also operates a website named Animal Liberation Front-line.  The website reportedly is intended to, "report on the Animal Liberation Front (A.L.F.) and all actions for animals carried out above the law."

Film appearances

Young had a cameo appearance in the film Bold Native, a film concerned with the topic of animal liberation. Young played the role of "Peter" in the film. Young has also been featured in documentaries, including Skin Trade, Edge - The Movie, and Speciesism: The Movie.

Home raids

In March 2010, the FBI served a search warrant on Young's home.  It was reported that cell phones, computers and other electronic items were confiscated by the FBI.  Young believed the FBI raided his home in an attempt to connect him to a 2004 Animal Liberation Front raid at the University of Iowa and because he was a supporter of the ALF.  Young stated, "The message is if you vocally support ALF, we're coming after you."

In August 2010, Young's home was raided by the FBI.  The search warrant alleged Young and his roommates had harbored Walter Bond, an individual suspected of setting fire to a leather shop and restaurant.  Young denied that Bond stayed at the home.

Law enforcement scrutiny

Young has been a vocal supporter of the ALF. As a result, he has continued to come under scrutiny from law enforcement, as demonstrated by the raids on his home.  This scrutiny not only resulted in raids on his home, but law enforcement has also used confidential informants to monitor Young.

Writings

The Blueprint: Complete Guide to Ending the Fur Industry. (Warcry Communications, 2020) 
The Jetsetting Terrorist.
This Country Must Change: Essays on the Necessity of Revolution in the USA. (Arissa Media Group, 2009).

See also
Animal rights and punk subculture
 List of animal rights advocates

References

Further reading
"Peter Young resources", Fur Commission USA.
An Interview with Animal Liberation Prisoner Peter Young, Animal Liberation Front website
Interview with Convicted ALF Warrior/Volunteer Peter Young, originally published in No Compromise Magazine, Issue 28.
Liddick, Donald. Eco-Terrorism

External links 

 

American male criminals
Living people
Year of birth missing (living people)
American animal rights activists
People extradited from Belgium
Place of birth missing (living people)
People extradited to the United States
People extradited within the United States
American prisoners and detainees
Prisoners and detainees of the United States federal government
Mercer Island High School alumni